Turkey Mountain is a summit in Floyd County, Georgia.

"Turkey" could be named after an individual American Indian or the bird.

References

Mountains of Floyd County, Georgia
Mountains of Georgia (U.S. state)